Bobby Hogg may refer to:
 Bobby Hogg (footballer, born 1914) (1914–1975), Scottish football player and manager
 Bobby Hogg (footballer, born 1947), soccer player who represented Australia
 Bobby Hogg (Cromarty speaker) (1920–2012), last speaker of the Cromarty dialect

See also 
 Robert Hogg (disambiguation)